Academic Evaluation Services (AES) is a global organization that provides evaluations of foreign academic credential and translation services. The organization is a member of the National Association of Credential Evaluation Services (NACES), the European Association for International Education (EAIE), and the NAFSA: Association of International Educators, formerly known as the National Association of Foreign Student Advisers.

Background
Founded in 2005, AES was created with a focus on foreign credential evaluations, international admissions, foreign student advising, university placement, and translations. AES is based in the United States, with its headquarters in Tampa, Florida. There are two receiving offices in New York City and Houston, Texas. The company provides services to clients all over the world in need of international credential evaluations for academic studies, employment, immigration, military and professional licensing. AES works with universities and institutions throughout the United States.

In recent years, the economic impact of international students on the U.S. economy is estimated to be $18.8 billion. The most recent increase in international students attending U.S. institutions represents the largest percentage increase in over 30 years and is only expected to grow. AES facilitates the fast and accurate evaluation of educational equivalencies that U.S. academic institutions, employers, and professional licensing boards, immigration services, and military rely on.

The mission of AES is to provide academic evaluation and translation services to foreign educated individuals so they may further their education and professional careers in the United States. Individuals who completed their education outside of the U.S. must have their credentials evaluated and put into the U.S. academic equivalents so they can be recognized by U.S. educational institutions, employers, licensing and professional boards, immigration and military.

AES conducts thousands of evaluations annually for individuals from countries worldwide.

References

External links
Official Website
Education In America

Educational organizations based in the United States